Amărăștii de Sus is a commune in Dolj County, Oltenia, Romania with a population of 3.847 people. It is composed of two villages, Amărăștii de Sus and Zvorsca. It also included Dobrotești and Nisipuri villages until 2004, when they were split off to form Dobrotești Commune.

References

Communes in Dolj County
Localities in Oltenia